The Smith & Wesson Model 1913 is a center fire semi-automatic pistol introduced by Smith & Wesson in 1913. This pistol was also known as the "Model 35".

Design
The Model 1913 was produced from 1913 to 1921, and approximately 8,350 were built. The Model 1913 was chambered in the now obsolete .35 S&W Auto cartridge. It featured smooth wooden grip panels, a fully grooved slide with crossbolt lock stud, and an ambidextrous safety that was operated with the middle finger of the shooting hand.

History and engineering changes
The Model 1913 was the first semi-automatic produced by Smith & Wesson.  It generally followed a design introduced by Charles Philibert Clement in 1903 initially chambered for the 5mm Clement and after 1906 for the .25 ACP.

 First Type—The grip safety was operated by pressing it to the rear.
 Second Type—The grip safety was redesigned so that it had to be pushed to the left and rearward.
 Third Type—The grip safety was changed back to the original style of operation.
 Fourth Type—The magazine catch was redesigned.
 Fifth Type—Used a heavier recoil spring and wider slide cross bolt lock.
 Sixth Type—The shape of the recoil spring channel was changed, and the sides of the slide were extended so they overlapped the sides of the frame.
 Seventh Type—The S&W stamp on the frame flat behind the grip was discontinued.
 Eighth Type—The caliber markings were moved from the left side of the barrel to the right, and the left was marked "Smith & Wesson."

References

Boorman, Dean K "The History of Smith & Wesson Firearms" page 56

Smith & Wesson semi-automatic pistols